Maharajganj may refer to:

Bihar, India
 Maharajganj, Siwan
 Maharajganj Subdivision
 Maharajganj (community development block)
 Maharajganj, Bihar Assembly constituency
 Maharajganj, Bihar Lok Sabha constituency

Uttar Pradesh, India
 Mahrajganj, Azamgarh
 Maharajganj district
 Mahrajganj, Uttar Pradesh
 Maharajganj (Uttar Pradesh Lok Sabha constituency)

Nepal
 Maharajganj, Nepal

See also 
 Mahrajganj (disambiguation)